The western New Guinea mountain rat (Rattus arrogans) is a species of rodent in the family Muridae. It is widespread in the mountains of central and western New Guinea.

References

Rattus
Rodents of New Guinea
Endemic fauna of New Guinea
Mammals of Western New Guinea
Rodents of Indonesia
Mammals described in 1922
Taxa named by Oldfield Thomas